Yeter Sevimli (1 December 1948 — 12 November 1992) was a Turkish boxer. He competed in the men's lightweight event at the 1968 Summer Olympics. He was killed by 7 robbers with guns in İstanbul in 12 November 1992.

References

External links
 

1948 births
1992 deaths
Turkish male boxers
Olympic boxers of Turkey
Boxers at the 1968 Summer Olympics
People from Hopa
Mediterranean Games silver medalists for Turkey
Mediterranean Games medalists in boxing
Competitors at the 1967 Mediterranean Games
Lightweight boxers
20th-century Turkish people